Most visitors to Indonesia may obtain a visa on arrival to Indonesia, unless they are a citizen of one of the visa-exempt countries. However, some countries must obtain a visa in advance from one of the Indonesian diplomatic missions before being allowed to enter Indonesia. All visitors must hold a passport valid for 6 months as well as a valid return ticket. Passport with validity of more than 3 months can be accepted in special cases or business travel. The immigration officer at the port of entry may ask the passenger to produce any necessary documents (such as hotel reservation and proof of finance).

Visa policy map

Visa exemption 
Following the COVID-19 pandemic in Indonesia, the Directorate General of Immigration published a new list of countries whose nationals are visa-exempt.

Nationals of a visa-exempt 10 countries may enter Indonesia through any of the designated border crossings, comprising 15 airports, 91 seaports and 12 cross-border land posts.

e-VOA / Visa on arrival 
Following the COVID-19 pandemic in Indonesia, the Directorate General of Immigration also published a new list of countries whose nationals are eligible to obtain a visa on arrival to Indonesia.

Nationals of the following 89 countries may apply for a e-VOA / Visa on arrival to Indonesia. A visa obtained on arrival costs Rp500,000, and is valid for a maximum stay of 30 days, though the visa can be extended once inside Indonesia for another 30 days at designated entry points by paying another Rp500,000.

Nationals of a country eligible for a visa on arrival may obtain a visa at any of the designated border crossings, comprising 16 airports, 91 seaports and 6 cross-border posts.

Transit without a visa 
Passengers transiting through Soekarno-Hatta International Airport for less than 24 hours, or other airports for less than 8 hours, do not require a visa. However, those who are switching terminals in Soekarno-Hatta, or those transiting through Ngurah Rai International Airport require a visa unless they are from a visa-exempt jurisdiction.

Approval required

Nationals who wish to obtain a multiple-entry visa, extend their visa (up to a maximum of five extensions) or who are not eligible for either visa-free entry or visa on arrival must apply for a visa in advance at an Indonesian embassy or consulate.

Nationals of the following 8 countries require prior approval from the Directorate General of Immigration in Jakarta. Besides a visa, they must hold a reference letter issued by the Directorate General of Immigration, as well as the invitation letter used to apply for their Indonesian visa before travelling to Indonesia. This policy is called the Indonesian Calling Visa.

Non-ordinary passports

Holders of diplomatic or service category passports issued by the following countries are allowed to visit Indonesia without a visa under visa waiver agreements:

, 
.

APEC Business Travel Card
Holders of passports issued by the following countries who possess an APEC Business Travel Card (ABTC) containing the "IDN" code on the reverse that it is valid for travel to Indonesia can enter visa-free for business trips for up to 60 days.

ABTCs are issued to nationals of:

Reform
In March 2015, Indonesian authorities announced that from April 2015 visas will be waived for citizens of 30 other countries, namely Austria, Bahrain, Belgium, Canada, China, Czech Republic, Denmark, Finland, France, Germany, Hungary, Italy, Japan, Mexico, Netherlands, New Zealand, Norway, Oman, Poland, Russia, Qatar, South Africa, South Korea, Spain, Sweden, Switzerland, United Arab Emirates, United Kingdom and the United States. For a visa waiver to enter into force Indonesian law stipulating mandatory reciprocity must be changed. In October 2015, the list was further extended by a new Presidential decree with another 45 countries.
Indonesian Government expects additional US$1.3 billion revenue for the foreign-exchange reserves as a result of the visa waiver. 
In May 2015, Vice President Jusuf Kalla announced that the visa-waiver will be extended to 60-70 countries as soon as the reciprocity clause was removed from the immigration law. 
On June 12, 2015, the Indonesian Government announced that it formally waives visa requirements for the 45 countries listed above for 30 days but the visit permit cannot be extended or changed to other permits.
On September 19, 2015, Indonesian authorities release the name of 45 additional countries and regions that will be eligible for visa free travel to Indonesia by the end of September 2015, namely Algeria, Angola, Argentina, Azerbaijan, Belarus, Bulgaria, Croatia, Cyprus, Dominica, Egypt, Estonia, Fiji, Ghana, Greece, Iceland, India, Ireland, Jordan, Kazakhstan, Kyrgyzstan, Latvia, Lebanon, Liechtenstein, Lithuania, Luxembourg, Maldives, Malta, Monaco, Panama, Papua New Guinea, Portugal, Romania, San Marino, Saudi Arabia, Seychelles, Slovakia, Slovenia, Suriname, Taiwan, Tanzania, Timor Leste, Tunisia, Turkey, Vatican City and Venezuela.
On December 21, 2015, Indonesian Maritime Coordinator Minister, Rizal Ramli announced that the visa-waiver policy will be extended to 84 additional countries by the end of 2015. The complete list are, Albania, Antigua and Barbuda, Armenia, Australia, Bahamas, Bangladesh, Barbados, Belize, Benin, Bhutan, Bolivia, Bosnia and Herzegovina, Botswana, Brazil, Burkina Faso, Burundi, Cameroon, Cape Verde, Chad, Comoros, Costa Rica, Côte d'Ivoire, Cuba, Dominican Republic, El Salvador, Gabon, Gambia, Georgia, Grenada, Guatemala, Guinea, Guyana, Haiti, Honduras, Jamaica, Kenya, Kiribati, Lesotho, Madagascar, Malawi, Mali, Marshall Islands, Mauritania, Mauritius, Moldova, Mongolia, Montenegro, Mozambique, Namibia, Nauru, Nepal, Nicaragua, North Korea, North Macedonia, Pakistan, Palau, Palestine, Paraguay, Rwanda, Samoa, São Tomé and Príncipe, Senegal, Serbia, Solomon Island, Somalia, Sri Lanka, St Kitts and Nevis, St Lucia, St Vincent and Grenadines, Sudan, Tajikistan, Togo, Tonga, Trinidad & Tobago, Turkmenistan, Tuvalu, Uganda, Ukraine, Uruguay, Uzbekistan, Vanuatu, Zambia, Zimbabwe, make it total of 174 countries that can enjoy visa-waiver policy to Indonesia.
 Reportedly, Indonesian President has signed the latest Presidential Decree on March 2, 2016 with regards to the revision of list of countries that are granted short-term visit visa-free facility. Out of 84 additional countries that were initially planned, only 78 were passed. Citizens of Cameroon, Guinea, Montenegro, North Korea, Pakistan, and Somalia will continue to require a visa prior to visit Indonesia.
 On August 5, 2020, Indonesian Foreign Minister Retno Marsudi signed a visa exemption agreement with Colombian Foreign Minister Claudia Blum allowing ordinary passport holders from Colombia to enter Indonesia visa-free for up to 30 days. It went into effect on September 15, 2020.

Visitor statistics
Most visitors arriving to Indonesia were from the following countries of nationality:

See also

 Visa requirements for Indonesian citizens
 Indonesian passport
Refugees in Indonesia
Tourism in Indonesia

References

External links
Indonesian Directorate General of Immigration
List of Indonesian diplomatic missions

Indonesia
Foreign relations of Indonesia